Kristyn Dunnion (born August 6, 1969, in Kingsville, Ontario) is a Canadian fiction writer and performance artist. She has published four novels and a short story collection to date. Her short fiction appears in literary journals, including Grain Magazine, The Tahoma Literary Review, and Cosmonauts Avenue, as well as in several anthologies. Dunnion is the 2015 Machigonne Fiction prize winner for the short story, "Last Call at the Dogwater Inn," published in The New Guard Volume V. For several years she performed cabaret shows under the name Miss Kitty Galore, and was the bassist in the all-female heavy metal band Heavy Filth (2008-2011). She currently plays bass in the Toronto-based rock band Bone Donor. Her more recent literary work is aimed at an adult audience, but earlier writing was primarily intended for young adult readers. Her writing incorporates aspects of science fiction, punk culture and horror literature, although she has also published several stories in anthologies of adult erotic literature.

Dunnion studied English and theater at McGill University and the University of Guelph.

Her short story collection The Dirt Chronicles was a nominee for the 2012 Lambda Literary Awards in the category of lesbian fiction. In 2021, she won the ReLit Award for short fiction for her 2020 short story collection Stoop City.

Works

Novels
Missing Matthew (2003)
Mosh Pit (2004)
Big Big Sky (2008)
Tarry This Night (2017)

Short story collections
The Dirt Chronicles (2011)
Stoop City (2020)

Anthologies
Tahoma Literary Review Issue #9 2016
The New Guard Volume V
subTerrain Volume 6 Issue #60
Grain Magazine Volume 41 Number 1
Glitterwolf halloween Special Edition
Saints + Sinners 2015
With a Rough Tongue: Femmes Write Porn
Periphery: Lesbian Erotic Futures
Fist of the Spiderwoman: Tales of Fear & Queer Desire
Geeks, Misfits and Outlaws
The Horrors: Terrifying Tales, Book One

References

External links
Official website

1969 births
Canadian women novelists
Canadian performance artists
Women performance artists
Canadian heavy metal musicians
Canadian lesbian writers
Canadian lesbian musicians
People from Essex County, Ontario
Writers from Ontario
Living people
Canadian science fiction writers
21st-century Canadian novelists
Canadian LGBT novelists
Canadian women short story writers
Women science fiction and fantasy writers
21st-century Canadian women writers
21st-century Canadian short story writers
20th-century Canadian LGBT people
21st-century Canadian LGBT people
Canadian LGBT artists
Women in metal
Lesbian novelists